The Nest is a 2020 period drama film written, directed, and produced by Sean Durkin. It stars Jude Law, Carrie Coon, Charlie Shotwell, Oona Roche, and Adeel Akhtar. It had its world premiere at the Sundance Film Festival on January 26, 2020, and was released in the United States and Canada on September 18, 2020, by IFC Films and Elevation Pictures respectively.

Plot
In the 1980s, Englishman Rory O'Hara and his American wife, Allison, live a middle-class life in New York City with their children Ben and Sam. Ben is their child together. Sam is Allison's daughter from a previous relationship. Allison teaches horseback riding, while Rory is a trader. Believing his opportunities in the US are limited, Rory convinces Allison to relocate with him to Britain, where he plans to return to the firm of his former employer Arthur Davis. Despite Allison's initial misgivings, the family moves into a huge old mansion in Surrey. Rory convinces Allison she can start her own horse farm on the property, buying a horse named Richmond for her. Construction begins on a stable. Ben is enrolled in an expensive private school. Sam is enrolled in a state school. Rory takes Allison to high-class dinner parties with Arthur and his colleagues. However, the family has some difficulty adjusting, as their secluded location and respective commutes make it difficult for the children to get to school on time.

Several weeks later, construction abruptly stops on the stable. Learning that Rory never paid the builders, Allison discovers that his bank account is nearly empty. Rory promises he will have money soon, but Allison is forced to provide for the family by cutting into her hidden cash fund. Allison bristles at Rory's efforts to appear high-class while they remain nearly broke. At the office, Rory proposes that Arthur sell his company to a larger American firm looking for a London office. After brief consideration, Arthur refuses. At the house, Richmond collapses in pain and Allison is forced to go to a neighboring farmer, who puts the horse down. Rather than go home following Arthur's rejection, Rory pays a visit to his mother, telling her about his family. She shows no interest in them and accuses Rory of abandoning her. Rory returns home late and gets into an explosive argument with Allison over their financial woes and Rory's reckless, delusional behavior.

In order to provide income to the household, Allison begins working as a farmhand for the farmer. Sam makes some disreputable friends from the area, while Ben gets into a fight with some bullies. Rory and his colleague Steve arrange a potentially lucrative deal with a Norwegian fish-farming corporation. Rory and Allison attend a dinner with Steve and their prospective clients, while Sam and her friends throw a party back at the house. As the party gets out of control, Ben flees outside and witnesses Richmond's carcass being pushed to the surface of the grave due to improper burial. At the dinner, Allison openly mocks Rory before leaving the restaurant, taking the car and getting drunk at a nightclub. Rory attempts to downplay Allison's behavior to the clients, but they opt to go into business with Steve while cutting Rory out. Rory tries to take a taxi back to Surrey and confesses his many indiscretions to the taxi driver, claiming his job is "pretending to be rich". With Rory's confessions making it clear that he is both broke and a liar, the driver anticipates that he will be unable to pay for the long fare and leaves him in the middle of nowhere.

The next morning, Allison wakes up hungover in her parked car and drives home, finding the house trashed after the party. Ben shows her Richmond's grave, where the carcass has risen almost completely to the surface. As Allison breaks down over the grave, Sam and Ben agree to make breakfast. Rory finishes the long walk home and finds his family seated at the table. He starts proposing another relocation, but Allison simply tells him to stop. Sam hugs a crying Rory, then prepares a seat for him.

Cast
 Jude Law as Rory O'Hara
 Carrie Coon as Allison O'Hara
 Charlie Shotwell as Benjamin "Ben" O'Hara
Oona Roche as Samantha "Sam" O'Hara
 Adeel Akhtar as Steve
 Anne Reid as Rory's Mum
 Michael Culkin as Arthur Davis
 Wendy Crewson as Allison's Mum
 Tattiawna Jones as Coach
 John Ross Harkin and Tobias Macey as The Builders
 James Nelson-Joyce as Taxi Driver
 Tanya Allen as Margy

Production
The project was announced in April 2018, with Jude Law and Carrie Coon set to star for writer and director Sean Durkin. Filming began in September 2018 in Canada for one week before moving to England.

Release
It had its world premiere at the Sundance Film Festival on January 26, 2020. Shortly after, IFC Films acquired distribution rights to the film. It was theatrically released on September 18, 2020 and on VOD on November 17, 2020.

Reception

Box office
The Nest grossed $137,852 in North America and $1.1 million in other territories, for a worldwide total of $1.2 million.

Critical response
The website's critics consensus reads: "An effective pairing of period setting and timeless themes, The Nest wrings additional tension out of its unsettling story with an outstanding pair of lead performances." On Metacritic, the film holds a weighted average score of 79 out of 100, based on 31 critics, indicating "generally favorable reviews".

The Nest was screened at the 2020 Deauville American Film Festival where it won the Grand Special Prize, the International Critics' prize and the Revelation Prize.

The film was named to the Toronto International Film Festival's year-end Canada's Top Ten list for feature films.

Awards

References

External links

2020 films
2020 psychological thriller films
American psychological thriller films
British psychological thriller films
Canadian psychological thriller films
Films set in country houses
Films shot in Toronto
Films shot in England
2020 independent films
BBC Film films
IFC Films films
FilmNation Entertainment films
English-language Canadian films
2020s English-language films
2020s Canadian films
2020s American films
2020s British films